The Sheffield Urban Area is a conurbation in the North of England with a population of 685,368 according to the 2011 census. This was a 7% increase on the 2001 population of 640,720 making it the 8th largest conurbation in the United Kingdom and England's 6th largest.  Named the Sheffield Urban Area by the Office for National Statistics, it must not be confused with the Sheffield City Region, a non-government term, although often used, particularly by the business community. In 2001 the population density of the urban area was 3,949.2 people per km2  by 2011 this had increased slightly to 4,092 people per km2.

The city of Sheffield contributes just over two thirds of the population of the whole conurbation.

Subdivisions
The conurbation's population is made up of the following subdivision, defined by the Office for National Statistics:

Nearby places
Settlements very close to the conurbation but not included in the official statistics include Wharncliffe Side and Oughtibridge, which are separated from Hillsborough by Worrall and a half-mile stretch of the A6102 Middlewood Road North and the towns of Wath upon Dearne, Brampton Bierlow, Swinton, Mexborough, Darfield and Conisbrough which are part of the Dearne Valley Urban Area and are separated from Rawmarsh by the Wentworth Road, with the A633 and Dearne Valley railway lines.
Slightly further afield, Dronfield, in Derbyshire, is around half a mile away from the Greenhill area of the city along the A61 and B6158.

See also
List of Settlements in South Yorkshire by population
List of conurbations in the United Kingdom
List of metropolitan areas in the United Kingdom

References

Geography of Sheffield
Urban areas of England